Jonas Wolcher (born April 15, 1973) is a Swedish director and producer known for best known for Die Zombiejäger, Dragonetti: The Ruthless Contract Killer and Cannibal Fog.

Dragonetti: The Ruthless Contract Killer

In 2010, Wolcher released Dragonetti: The Ruthless Contract Killer as a prequel to 2005's Die Zombiejäger.

He said of the film: "The extreme violence must be the worst thing ever filmed in Sweden. This is ultraviolence.". He described the film as an Ichi the Killer, Pusher and Rambo: First Blood Part II thrown into a blender spiced with angel dust and demonism.

Cannibal Fog

In 2014, Wolcher released Cannibal Fog, an art house horror film. The film was shot on a modest budget of €1,000.

The film was well received. Critic Karen Oughton declared the film to be "a finely mixed, jangling masterpiece of humanity masquerading as merry mayhem."

Personal

Jonas was born on 15 April 1973 in Gothenburg at Östra Sjukhuset, and grew up mostly in Skåne. In 1997 he went to Gothenburg University to study Film Theory, but dropped out after a year. His first attempt at a film project was a Swedish version of Blair Witch Project, which didn't come to be; his first actual film was a short called "Deadly Milk". 

Wolcher attended culinary school.

Filmography

References

http://chud.com/yan-birch-handsome-devil-interview/
http://www.jonaswolcher.com/
http://theatreofblood.se/tob-moter-jonas-wolcher-skapare-av-svensk-genrefilm
http://jensdanielburman.com/noveller-att-lasa/jonas-wolcher/#sthash.x6dsnBDp.dpbs
http://frombeyond.se/podcast-special-intervju-med-jonas-wolcher/
http://screenanarchy.com/2017/08/swedish-cult-movie-maker-jonas-wolcher-goes-back-in-time-contrib.html
https://www.amazon.com/gp/search?index=books&linkCode=qs&keywords=9780786492886

Swedish film directors
Swedish experimental filmmakers
Living people
1973 births